The Richard Berry Jr. House is a historic house in the Clintonville neighborhood of Columbus, Ohio, United States. The house was listed on the National Register of Historic Places in 2005 and the Columbus Register of Historic Properties in 2006. It is a well-preserved example of early 20th century Colonial Revival houses. It was built in 1926 and designed by Columbus architect Ray Sims.

See also
 National Register of Historic Places listings in Columbus, Ohio

References

Houses completed in 1926
National Register of Historic Places in Columbus, Ohio
Houses in Columbus, Ohio
Houses on the National Register of Historic Places in Ohio
Colonial Revival architecture in Ohio
Columbus Register properties
Clintonville (Columbus, Ohio)
Individually listed contributing properties to historic districts on the National Register in Ohio
Historic district contributing properties in Columbus, Ohio